Automatic Self-Cleansing Filter Syndicate Co Ltd v Cuninghame [1906] 2 Ch 34 is a UK company law case, which concerns the enforceability of provisions in a company's constitution.

The Court of Appeal affirmed that directors were not agents of the shareholders and so were not bound to implement shareholder resolutions, where special rules already provided for a different procedure.

Facts
There were 2700 shares and the plaintiff, Mr McDiarmid, owned 1202 of them. The company was in the business of purifying and storing liquids. He wanted the company to sell its assets to another company. At a meeting he got 1502 of the shares to vote in favour of such a resolution, with his friends. The directors were opposed to it. They declined to comply with the resolution. So Mr McDiarmid brought this action in the name of the company, against the company directors, including Mr Cuninghame.

The constitution stated that only a three quarter majority could remove the directors. It said the general power of management was vested in the directors ‘subject to such regulations as might from time to time be made by extraordinary resolution’ (art 96). They were also explicitly allowed to sell company property (art 91). In this case the words ‘regulations’ referred to the articles of association. So the articles could be changed by a three quarter majority of votes. It did not say anything about issuing directions to the directors.

Judgment

High Court
Warrington J held that on the true construction of the articles that unless directions were given through special resolution, then it was impossible for a mere majority to override the views of the directors. This was simply a matter of construction.

Court of Appeal
Lord Collins MR held that the simple majority of shareholders was not enough to override the requirement in the constitution that the directors may only be given instructions through a three quarter majority. So the directors were entitled to reject the offer. They are not agents to the shareholders nor the company. The shareholders would need to dismiss the directors or change the constitution. He elaborated.

Cozens Hardy LJ agreed. He said that

See also

Quin & Axtens Ltd v Salmon [1909] AC 442

Notes

References

United Kingdom company case law
1906 in case law
1906 in British law
Court of Appeal (England and Wales) cases